Paranda is a town in the Indian state of Maharashtra.

Paranda may also refer to:
 Paranda Tahsil, tehsil in Maharashtra, India
 Paranda Fort, a fort in Maharashtra, India
 Paranda (music)
 Punjabi paranda, a hair accessory worn by women in Punjab, India
 Parranda,  a Puerto Rican music tradition